Monsieur (de) Sallebray (or Salbray, whose first name is unknown) was a 17th-century French poet and playwright.

He may have been a bedroom valet of King Louis XIV and published five theatre plays and some poems.

Works 
 ~ 1635: Description de la belle chapelle de la maison royale de Fontainebleau, ode.
 1639: Le Jugement de Pâris et le ravissement d'Hélène, tragicomedy (text on Gallica)
 1640: La Troade, tragedy (text on Gallica)
 1642: L'Amante ennemie, tragicomedy (text on Gallica)
 1642: La Belle Égyptienne, tragicomedy (text on Gallica)
 1639: L'Enfer divertissant, comedy
 1660: Épigramme du songe du resveur

Quote 
In his catalogue of the Bibliothèque dramatique de Monsieur de Soleinne (n° 1177), Paul Lacroix writes: "There's something of Corneille in this author, to whom Corneille sometimes borrows thoughts and verse. This response by Andromaque to Ulysse (La Troade) is sublime:
Threat me to live and not to die.

See also 
 17th-century French literature

External links 
 His theatre plays on CÉSAR

17th-century French male writers
17th-century French dramatists and playwrights
Year of birth missing
Year of death missing